The Heartland Corridor is a public-private partnership between the Norfolk Southern Railway (NS) and the Federal Highway Administration and three U.S. states to improve railroad freight operations. 

The $150 million plan was developed to facilitate more efficient travel on NS rail lines between the Norfolk, Virginia port region and two Midwest destinations—Chicago, Illinois and Columbus, Ohio. One of the project goals was to increase clearances in tunnels to permit the operation of double-stack intermodal trains, increasing the capacity of rail lines, shortening rail journeys and reducing tractor-trailer traffic. New shipping terminals for intermodal connections are also planned for key locations.

Construction began in 2007, and the route opened for double stack service on September 9, 2010.

The project involved raising clearances in 28 tunnels and 24 other overhead obstacles.

In June 2010, NS announced that it had reached an agreement with Ohio to extend a leg of the Heartland Corridor southwesterly from Columbus to Cincinnati, which is located on the Ohio River near the border where Ohio, Kentucky and Indiana converge. The $6.1 million cost will be funded with federal economic stimulus funds and the Ohio-Kentucky-Indiana Regional Council of Governments, plus money from NS.

See also 

 National Gateway – railroad improvement project by CSX Transportation
 Norfolk Southern Crescent Corridor – proposed railroad project running between Louisiana and New Jersey
 Virginia Port Authority operator of three major port terminals on the harbor of Hampton Roads
 Chicago Region Environmental and Transportation Efficiency Program (CREATE)

References

External links
 NS Photos of Heartland Corridor Tunnel Expansion Projects

Norfolk Southern Railway
Rail freight transportation in the United States
Rail infrastructure in Illinois
Transportation planning
Rail infrastructure in Virginia